Sardar-e Jangal District is a district (bakhsh) in Fuman County, Gilan Province, Iran. At the 2006 census, its population was 15,339, in 4,065 families.  The District has two cities: Masuleh and Maklavan.  The District has two rural districts (dehestan): Aliyan Rural District and Sardar-e Jangal Rural District.

References 

Fuman County
Districts of Gilan Province